
Gmina Pałecznica is a rural gmina (administrative district) in Proszowice County, Lesser Poland Voivodeship, in southern Poland.

Villages
Gmina Pałecznica contains the villages and settlements of Bolów, Czuszów, Gruszów, Ibramowice, Łaszów, Lelowice-Kolonia, Nadzów, Niezwojowice, Pałecznica, Pamięcice, Pieczonogi, Solcza, Sudołek and Winiary.

Neighbouring gminas
Gmina Pałecznica is bordered by the gminas of Kazimierza Wielka, Proszowice, Racławice, Radziemice and Skalbmierz.

References
Polish official population figures 2006

Palecznica
Proszowice County